A plat is a type of cadastral map.

Plat or Plats may also refer to:
Plat, Rogaška Slatina, a settlement in the Rogaška Slatina municipality, Slovenia
Plat, Mežica, a settlement in the Mežica municipality, Slovenia
Plat, Croatia, a small resort town in Župa Dubrovačka, Croatia
Tissue plasminogen activator (abbreviated PLAT), a protein involved in the breakdown of blood clots
Vojtěch Plát (born 1994), Czech chess grandmaster
Plats, Ardèche, France
Plat, in gardening history, a plain grass section of a parterre

See also
Plait (disambiguation) (pronounced "plat"), 
Platt (disambiguation)
Platen (disambiguation)
Plate (disambiguation)
Plot (disambiguation)